Janina Bauman ( Lewinson; 18 August 1926, in Warsaw – 29 December 2009, in Leeds) was a Polish journalist and writer of Jewish origin.

Biography 
She was the daughter of Szymon Lewinson (1896–1940), a urologist and Polish Army officer murdered in the Katyn massacre, and of Alina, née Fryszman (1900–1980). She had one sister, Zofia (1930–1971). On her mother's side she was the granddaughter of the physician Aleksander Fryszman (1874–1939) and the niece of Jerzy Fryszman (1904–1976) and of Leon Płockier (1895–1965).

During World War II she was a prisoner in the Warsaw Ghetto with her mother and sister. They managed to escape and were sheltered by a peasant family in the countryside. After the war she studied journalism at the Warsaw Academy of Political and Social Science, where she met her future husband, Zygmunt Bauman. She subsequently worked in the film industry as a translator, researcher and script editor. She left Poland with her husband in 1968 after the antisemitic purges, that followed the March 1968 events. They initially went to Israel, however, after three years they decided to settle permanently in Leeds, England, where she lived until the end of her life.

She married Zygmunt Bauman (1925–2017). They had three daughters.

In 2010 the Bauman Family established the Janina Bauman Prize to be awarded for a winning essay submitted to the Bauman Institute at the University of Leeds.

Books 
In Polish
 
 
 

In English
 Winter in the Morning (1986), based on diaries she kept as a young girl during the war
 A Dream of Belonging (1988). Both were republished in one volume as:
 Beyond These Walls (2009) all with Virago Press

About Janina Bauman 
 Janina Bauman, Als Mädchen im Warschauer Ghetto. Ein Überlebensbericht. Aus dem Englischen von Reinhard Wagner. Mit einem Nachwort von Władysław Bartoszewski. Verlag Max Hueber, Ismaning bei München 1986. 
 Peter Wagner : Between two wars: Janina and Zygmunt Bauman's analyses of the contemporary human condition , 2003

See also
 Eva Hoffman

References

1926 births
2009 deaths
Warsaw Ghetto inmates
Polish women journalists
Writers from Warsaw
Polish emigrants to the United Kingdom
British Jewish writers
20th-century Polish women writers
20th-century Polish writers
20th-century Polish journalists